Muḥammad Bey Abū aḏ-Ḏahab (1735–1775), also just called Abū Ḏahab (meaning "father of gold", a name apparently given to him on account of his generosity and wealth), was a Mamluk emir and regent of Ottoman Egypt.

Born in the North Caucasus region of Circassia or in Abkhazia he was kidnapped and sold to the Mamluk Emir Ali Bey al-Kabir in Egypt. He became Ali Bey's closest and favourite fellow, his most trusted general and even his brother-in-law (according to other sources: son-in-law or adoptive son).

During the Russo-Turkish War Ali Bey declared Egypt's independence from the Ottoman Empire and allegedly attempted to restore the former Mamluk Sultanate which was conquered by the Ottoman Turks 250 years before. On behalf of Ali Bey, Abu Dhahab suppressed a revolt in Upper Egypt (1769), seized the Hejaz (1770) and - allied with the Palestinian emir Zahir al-Umar - conquered large parts of Ottoman Syria (1771). Having taken Damascus (1772) from its Ottoman governor Uthman Pasha al-Kurji, Abu Dhahab changed sides, handed over all the conquered territories to the Ottomans and marched against Cairo. Ali Bey fled to Zahir al-Umar in Acre, and Abu Dhahab became the new Shaykh al-Balad (civil governor) and de facto ruler of Egypt.

When Ali Bey came back and tried to restore his position, he was defeated and killed by Abu Dhahab's forces near Cairo (1773). Acting on Ottoman orders Abu Dhahab then invaded Palestine to defeat Emir Zahir, too. After conquering Gaza, Jaffa  and Acre, he suddenly died of the plague. His comrades Murad Bey and Ibrahim Bey, the leaders of his Mamluk faction (Abu-Dhahab faction or Muhammadiyya), succeeded him in power.

See also
Jazzar Pasha (1720/30s – 1804), associate of Abu al-Dhahab in Cairo
Mosque of Abu al-Dhahab

References

Literature
 ʿAbdarraḥmān al-Ǧabartī, Arnold Hottinger (translator): Bonaparte in Ägypten - Aus den Chroniken von ʿAbdarraḥmān al-Ǧabartī, pages 46–58 and 332f. Piper, Munich 1989
 Robin Leonard Bidwell: Dictionary of Modern Arab History, page 24f. London/New York 1998
 Arthur Goldschmidt jr.: Historical Dictionary of Egypt, page 29f. Lanham 2013

Further reading
 David Crecelius, 'The Waqf of Muhammad Bey Abu al-Dhabab', Journal of the American Research Center in Egypt, vol. 25 (1978), pp. 83–105; vol. 26 (1979), pp. 125–46.
 David Crecelius, The Roots of Modern Egypt: A Study of the Refimes of 'Ali Bey al-Kebir and Muhammad Bey Abu al-Dhabab, 1760–1775. Studies in Middle Eastern History, 6. Chicago: Bibliotheca Islamica, 1981.
 Sauveur Lusignan: A history of the Revolution of Ali Bey against the Ottoman Porte. London 1783

1735 births
1775 deaths
18th-century Ottoman governors of Egypt
18th-century deaths from plague (disease)
Egyptian nobility
Mamluks
Political people from the Ottoman Empire
Slaves from the Ottoman Empire
Ottoman governors of Egypt
18th-century slaves